The Lal Mahal (Red Palace) of Pune is one of the most famous monuments located in Pune, India, where Chhatrapati Shivaji Maharaj, founder of the Maratha Empire spent his childhood.

History
In the year 1630 AD, Shivaji Maharaj's Father Shahaji Raje Bhosale, established the Lal Mahal for his wife Jijabai and son. Shivaji Maharaj stayed here for several years until he captured his first fort. The current Lal Mahal is a reconstruction of the original and located in the center of the Pune city. The original Lal Mahal was built with the idea of rejuvenating the recently razed city of Pune when Shahaji Raje entered the city along with 
Shivaji and his mother, Maasaheb Jijabai. Young Shivaji Maharaj grew up here, and stayed in the Lal Mahal till he captured the Torna fort in 1645. Chhatrapati Shivaji Maharaj's marriage with his first wife, Saibai took place in Lal Mahal on 16 May 1640.

The Lal Mahal is also famous for an encounter between Shivaji Maharaj and Shaista Khan where Shivaji Maharaj cut off the latter's fingers when he was trying to escape from the window of the Lal Mahal. This was part of a surreptitious guerrilla attack on the massive and entrenched Mughal Army that had camped in Pune, with Shaista occupying (possibly symbolically) Shivaji Maharaj's childhood home. As a punishment for the ignominy of the defeat despite superior numbers and better armed and fed soldiers, Shaista was transferred by the Mughal Emperor to Bengal.

Towards the end of the 17th Century, the Lal Mahal was ruined by some people and was eventually razed to the ground as a result of various attacks on the city. It is said that during the construction of the Shaniwarwada, some soil and stones of the Lal Mahal were used for luck. In 1734-35, a few houses were constructed on the land of the Lal Mahal and given for use to Ranoji Shinde and Ramchandraji. The records in the offices of the Peshwas mention that Lal Mahal was used for arranging feasts for the Brahmins during the thread-ceremony of Sadashivrao Bhau, son of Chimaji Appa. The exact original location of the Lal Mahal is unknown, however it was known to be very close to the location of Shaniwarwada, which is roughly where the current reconstruction stands.

Reconstruction and current structure
The current Lal Mahal was built only on a part of the land of the original Lal Mahal. The new Lal Mahal was not rebuilt in the same fashion as the original one and there is not much information found about the area and structure of the original Lal Mahal. The current Lal Mahal was rebuilt by the Pune Municipal Corporation. Construction started in 1984 and was completed in 1988.

The current Lal Mahal is a memorial holding a collection of large-size oil paintings based on the significant events in the life of Shivaji Maharaj, a statue of Jijabai, a carving depicting Shivaji Maharaj using a gold plow along with Jijabai, a fiber model of Raigad with horsemen and a huge map of Maharashtra indicating the forts of Shivaji Maharaj. The popular Jijamata Garden is now a recreational park for kids.

See also
Chhatrapati Shivaji Maharaj
Maharani Saibai
Chhatrapati Sambhaji Maharaj
Maratha Empire
Bhonsle family ancestry

References

Buildings and structures of the Maratha Empire
Palaces in Maharashtra
Tourist attractions in Pune
Royal residences in India